Yelgildino (Yılgilde) is a rural locality (a village) in Turnalinsky Selsoviet, Salavatsky District, Bashkortostan, Russia. The population was 24 as of 2010. There is 1 street.

Geography 
Yelgildino is located 31 km northeast of Maloyaz (the district's administrative centre) by road. Yukalikulevo is the nearest rural locality.

References 

Rural localities in Salavatsky District